Finkenkrug station is a railway station in the Finkenkrug district in the municipality of Falkensee, located in the Havelland district in Brandenburg, Germany.

References

Railway stations in Brandenburg
Buildings and structures in Havelland (district)